A music executive or record executive is a person within a record label who works in senior management and makes executive decisions over the label's artists. Their role varies greatly but in essence, they can oversee one, or many, aspects of a record label, including A&R, contracts, management, publishing, production, manufacture, marketing/promotion, distribution, copyright, and touring. Although music executives work in senior management, a number of music executives have gone on to establish their own record labels as owners themselves, sometimes being involved in the music industry initially as artists, A&Rs, or producers for a number of years and building a strong reputation.

Music executives work in a variety of settings for major record labels such as Universal Music Group, Sony Music Entertainment, or Warner Music Group. However, many choose to work with, or start their own independent record labels such as Sub Pop, Block Starz Music, Ironworks, Jagjaguwar, Perry Music Group, 50/50innertainment, and 419 Records.

See also 
 Record producer
 Electronic music
 Audio engineer
 Musician
 Hip hop production

References 

Business occupations

Occupations in music
Music production